MP3: Mera Pehla Pehla Pyaar (English: My Very First Love) is a Bollywood romantic comedy film starring Ruslaan Mumtaz and Hazel Crowney in the lead roles. It was written and directed by Robby Grewal.

Synopsis 

Delhi-based Rohan (Ruslaan Mumtaz) lives in  a wealthy lifestyle with his dad, Shekhar (Kanwaljit Singh), a businessman who owns an apparel business, and mom, Renu (Menekka Arora). He attends St. Lawrence High School and is friends with Vasu, Sudhir and Javed. Together the friends land in hot water virtually every day. Then everything changes when he first sets eyes on heart-achingly beautiful new student, Ayesha Mehra (Hazel Crowney), who was born in London and also lives a wealthy lifestyle with her mom, Sheetal, and businessman dad.

Rohan and Ayesha are attracted to each other and decide to go on a karaoke date — with disastrous results as they end up in a vehicle accident. Their relationship sours with rumors of Ayesha being attracted to Shantanu and Rohan dating Simran. They part ways. Ayesha and her mom go to Paris to visit her aunt Parminder and her husband, Tony. Realizing that he now loves Ayesha, Rohan decides to travel to Paris, clear the misunderstanding, and win her over. To do this he misuses his dad's credit card to book an air-ticket and forges school documents to show that he is attending the math Olympiad in Paris.

He reaches Paris but is unable to locate Ayesha. When he approaches the Indian embassy, he is detained and may well be deported back home to face his angry father and school authorities. He calls Ayesha and asks her to meet him at 7:30 at the Eiffel Tower. He uses a cigarette to raise the fire alarm of the embassy. Later he runs to the tower and surprises Ayesha where he gives her a rose and expresses his feelings towards her. Ayesha accepts his love, they finally unite and have their first kiss, later realizing that Ayesha's relatives were present at the sight, too.

Cast 
Ruslaan Mumtaz as Rohan Sood
Hazel Crowney as Ayesha Mehra 
Manoj Pahwa as Tony Singh 
Kanwaljit Singh as Shekhar Sood, Rohan's Father
Gaurav Gera as Sameer Kohli
Jay Soni as Rohan's classmate 
Ashiesh Roy as Chief Official at Indian Embassy 
Sarthak Bhasin as Javed Sheikh, Rohan's Friend

Soundtrack
The music of MP3 was composed by the duo of Ashutosh Phatak and Dhruv Ghanekar.

References

External links
 

2007 films
2000s Hindi-language films
Indian romantic musical films
Indian teen comedy films
2000s teen comedy films
2000s romantic musical films